The Magnus Harmonica Corporation (originally the International Plastic Harmonica Corporation) was founded in 1944 in New Jersey by Danish immigrant Finn Magnus (1905–1976). First supplying American troops in World War II, and later marketed to children and other beginners, the company's harmonicas (as well as its accordions, bagpipes, and mechanical reed organs) used a then-unique molded-plastic reed comb. The styrene-based plastic construction resulted in lower cost, greater durability, and a distinct sound compared to other free reed aerophones with metal reeds.

In 1958, Magnus joined with television salesman Eugene Tracey, and their company went on to sell millions of inexpensive electric chord organs and song books until the late 1970s under the name Magnus Organ Corporation. Early Magnus Chord Organs were either laptop or tabletop models, with some of the later models having integrated legs and a lighted music stand. At its peak, Magnus employed over 1,800 workers in Linden, New Jersey, including a "mother's shift" during school hours and a "work release" program for non-violent inmates of the nearby Rahway State Prison.

After Magnus and Tracey retired, the publishers of World Book Encyclopedia ultimately acquired the Magnus sheet music catalog and ceased production of Magnus instruments.

Magnus harmonica models

Magnus organ models 
 300: Tabletop Model, Two Octave, Six Major chord, Brown or Cream Plastic Case  - c. 1960s
 302: Tabletop Model, Two Octave, Six Major chord, Brown Plastic Case with faux wood
 303: Free-Standing Model, Three Octave, Six Major chord, Six Minor chord, Brown Plastic Case - c. 1970s
 306: Free-Standing Model, Three Octave, Six Major chord, Six Minor chord, Brown Plastic Case
 350: Tabletop Model, Two Octave, Six Major chord, Brown Plastic Case
 360: Tabletop Model, Two Octave, Six Major chord, Cream Plastic Case  - c. 1970s
 380: Tabletop Model, Two Octave, Six Major chord, Cream Plastic Case with faux wood  - c. 1960s
 391: Tabletop Model, Three Octave, Six Major chord, Six Minor chord, Brown Plastic Case - c. 1970s
 400: Tabletop Model, Three Octave, Six Major chord, Six Minor chord, Brown Plastic Case - c. 1970s
 468: Tabletop Model, Three Octave, Six Major chord, Six Minor chord, Cream Plastic Case - c. 1970s
 481: Tabletop Model, Three Octave, Six Major chord, Six Minor chord, Brown Plastic Case - c. 1970s
 500: Tabletop Model, Three Octave, Six Major chord, Six Minor chord, Real Wood Case
 535: Free-Standing Model, Three Octave, Six Major chord, Six Minor chord, Real Wood Case - c. 1968/69
 545: Free-Standing Model, Three Octave, Six Major chord, Six Minor chord, Real Wood Case
 549: Free-Standing Model, Three Octave, Six Major chord, Six Minor chord, Six Bass Notes - c. 1960s
 655: Tabletop Model, Three Octave, Six Major chord, Six Minor chord, Faux Wood Case
 657: Tabletop Model, Three Octave, Six Major chord, Six Minor chord, Brown Plastic Case with faux wood - c. 1970s
 660: Free-Standing Model, Three Octave, Six Major chord, Six Minor chord, Six Seventh chord, Brown Plastic Case
 665: Tabletop Model, Three Octave, Six Major chord, Six Minor chord, Brown Plastic Case with faux wood - c. 1970s
 668: Tabletop Model, Three Octave, Six Major chord, Six Minor chord, Brown Plastic Case
 670: Free-Standing Model, Three Octave, Six Major chord, Six Minor chord, Brown Plastic Case - c. 1970s
 700: Tabletop Model, Three Octave, Eight Major chord, Eight Minor chord, Faux Wood Case
 890: Free-Standing Model, Three Octave, Eight Major chord, Eight Minor chord, Eight Bass Notes, Wood Case - c. 1960s
 1510: Laptop Model, Two Octave, No Chord buttons, Brown Bakelite Case - c. 1950s
 8100: Tabletop Model, Three Octave, Six Major chord, Six Minor chord, Brown Plastic Case - c. 1960s
 Disney Edition: Same as Model 360 but has Orange Plastic Case - c. late 1970s

Notes

Musical instrument manufacturing companies of the United States
Harmonica manufacturers
Free reed aerophones
Keyboard instruments
1944 establishments in New Jersey
Linden, New Jersey
Companies based in Union County, New Jersey
Defunct manufacturing companies based in New Jersey